Aubin Grove is a suburb of Perth, Western Australia in the City of Cockburn. The suburb was approved in 2003.

Aubin Grove was formerly part of the rural locality of Banjup. It is named after Henry John Aubin, who leased agricultural land in the area in 1897.

It has grown rapidly, from a population of 351 at the 2006 census to 6,324 at the 2016 census.

Transport
Aubin Grove railway station in neighbouring Atwell opened on 23 April 2017.

References

External links

Suburbs of Perth, Western Australia
Suburbs in the City of Cockburn